Azaruddin Bloch (born 1 February 1985) is an Indian first-class cricketer who plays for Services.

References

External links
 

1985 births
Living people
Indian cricketers
Services cricketers
People from Rajkot